The firefighter referendum of 1995 was the first Citizens Initiated Referendum held in New Zealand on , based on the question:
Should the number of professional firefighters employed full time in the New Zealand Fire Service be reduced below the number employed on 1 January 1995?

Results
The referendum returned an extremely low voter turnout, with less than 27% of enrolled voters casting a vote.

Aftermath
The referendum was rejected with a huge margin, but career firefighter numbers were reduced regardless. There were 1819 career firefighters on 1 January 1995, 1573 in 1998 and 1702 in 2009.

References

Firefighter referendum, 1995
1995 New Zealand firefighter referendum
1995 referendums
Firefighter referendum
Firefighter referendum
History of firefighting
Firefighting in New Zealand